Peter Bance is a Sikh historian, author, art collector and Maharaja Duleep Singh archivist.  His grandfather emigrated to the UK in the 1930s.

Bance is the author of several books: 
The Duleep Singhs: Photograph Album of Queen Victoria's Maharajah (2004)
 Khalsa Jatha British Isles Centenary 1908-2008 (2008) 
 Sikhs in Britain: 150 Years of Photography (2012), 
 Sovereign, Squire and Rebel: Maharajah Duleep Singh & the Heirs of a Lost Kingdom (2009)

He has also appeared in many BBC programmes such as The Story Of The Turban (2012), Inside Out (2004), Desi DNA (2005), Britain's Maharajah (2013), Sophia: Suffragette Princess (2015) and The Stolen Maharajah: Britain's Indian Royal (2018)

References

British historians
British Sikhs
Living people
British male writers
Year of birth missing (living people)